The Lonely Voice of Man, also known as The Lonely Human Voice, is the first full-feature film by Alexander Sokurov. It was originally filmed in 1978 and reconstructed in 1987 at the Lenfilm studios. The film is largely based on Andrei Platonov's River Potudan and Origin of the Master, although it is not a direct film adaptation in the traditional sense but rather a recreation of the spiritual nature of Platonov's prose.

Background
Originally intended by Sokurov as his diploma defense at the VGIK, The Lonely Voice of Man was banned in the USSR until the glasnost. Upon release in 1987 it was immediately critically acclaimed and nominated for a number of awards. Most notably the film won the Bronzen Leopard at the Locarno International Film Festival.

All the actors in the film were amateurs, and a combination of this along with the sulky provincial landscapes created a sense of realism coupled with artistry that made the feature stand out. Here Sokurov already began to approach his main theme - the tragic separation between the body and the soul. In his diary, Sokurov noted that in Platonov, he saw the "story of a 'weak heart', for which happiness was 'hard work'." Love and ongoing life are eternal, but unachievable, dreams for the characters.

The film is dedicated to Andrei Tarkovsky who supported Sokurov morally during his battle against the Soviet censors.

References

External links 

Sokurov's website
 

1978 drama films
Soviet drama films
Russian drama films
Films directed by Alexander Sokurov
Lenfilm films
1980s Russian-language films
1978 directorial debut films